Parliamentary elections were held in the Comoros on 3 December 1972. The result was a victory for the Democratic Rally of the Comorian People–Comorian Democratic Union alliance, which won over 75% of the vote. Turnout was 81.5%.

Results

References

Comoros
Elections in the Comoros
1972 in the Comoros
December 1972 events in Africa